Meydavud-e Olya (also Romanized as Meydāvūd-e ‘Olyā, Meydāvūd ‘Olyā, Meidavood Olya, and Meydāvod-e ‘Olyā; also known as Mai Dāud, Mai Dāūd Bāla, Meydāvūd, Meydāvūd Bālā, Meydāvūd-e Bālā, and Mey Dāvuūd-e Bālā) is a village in Meydavud Rural District, Meydavud District, Bagh-e Malek County, Khuzestan Province, Iran. At the 2006 census, its population was 152, in 38 families.

References 

Populated places in Bagh-e Malek County